Farm & Fireside was a semi-monthly national farming magazine that was established in 1877 and was published until 1939. It was based in Springfield, Ohio.

It was the original magazine for what eventually became the Crowell-Collier Publishing Company. In February 1930, it was renamed The Country Home in an attempt to compete with Better Homes and Gardens.

References

External links
Farm & Fireside at the Internet Archive
A history of Crowell-Collier

Agricultural magazines
Biweekly magazines published in the United States
Defunct magazines published in the United States
Magazines established in 1877
Magazines disestablished in 1939
Magazines published in Ohio
1877 establishments in Ohio